Masatane (written: 昌胤 or 正種) is a masculine Japanese given name. Notable people with the name include:

 (1531–1575), Japanese samurai
 (1890–1983), Japanese general

Japanese masculine given names